The Movement for the Labour Party was a socialist and trade union-inspired political party in Italy.

It was formed in September 2012 by the merger of Socialism 2000 (leader: Cesare Salvi) and Labour–Solidarity (leader: Gian Paolo Patta), both constituent members of the Federation of the Left (FdS). The party aimed at forming a broad labour party including communists, socialists and trade unionists.

References

External links

2012 establishments in Italy
Defunct socialist parties in Italy
Labour parties
Left-wing politics in Italy
Political parties established in 2012
Political parties with year of disestablishment missing